Capital MetroRapid is a bus rapid transit service in Austin, Texas, owned and operated by the Capital Metropolitan Transportation Authority (Capital Metro).  It currently consists of two routes which run north-south served by stations designed by McKinney York Architects.

Service on the first route, MetroRapid North Lamar/South Congress (Route 801), began on January 26, 2014. It replaced existing MetroBus Routes 1L/1M and the 101 Express, which traveled along the same corridor. (1M was renamed Route 1 Metric/South Congress, while a local version of the northernmost portion of former route 1L was created as Route 275.  The Metric corridor is now served by 325.)  Before the original Route 1 North Lamar/South Congress was split into 1L/1M in 2006, it was the busiest line in the Capital Metro system and peaked at 10 minutes headways Monday through Friday, with wider headways on the weekends.  (The current Route 1 has wider headways, resulting in overcrowding buses.)  Route 801 serves 29 stations between Tech Ridge in North Austin and Southpark Meadows via the University of Texas and Downtown Austin.

A second route, MetroRapid Burnet/South Lamar (Route 803), serves a total of 28 stations between The Domain and Westgate. It began operation during August 2014, but the original Burnet/Manchaca Route 3 remained in service at slightly reduced frequency.

Description and Headways
As both Routes 801 and 803 run north to south, each travels down North Lamar Boulevard and Burnet Road respectively, from their northern terminuses.  Approaching the Guadalupe Street corridor, both share stops from 31st Street along Guadalupe into the UT area, The Drag and downtown.  Both lines then diverge at Cesar Chavez Street, and the 801 and 803 continue along South Congress Avenue and South Lamar Boulevard respectively to their southern terminuses.

Capital MetroRapid begins service at 5 a.m. Monday through Friday, with both lines operating high-frequency service of 10 minutes during the day, with early mornings and early evenings every 15 minutes; service ends at 12:30 a.m. Monday thru Wednesday and at 2:30 a.m. Thursday and Friday nights.  On Saturdays, it operates from 6 a.m. to 2:30 a.m., and Sundays from 7 a.m. to 11:30 a.m.  Weekend daytime headways consist of every 15 minutes, and seven nights a week (including late Thursday to Saturday nights), every 20 minutes.

List of Capital MetroRapid stations

Route 801 - North Lamar/South Congress
north to south

Route 803 - Burnet/South Lamar
north to south

New stops
The 801 and 803 started to stop at 31st and Guadalupe during the summer of 2018.  The usual MetroRapid red shelters (with displays showing how soon the next buses will arrive) were not installed until October.

Broken Spoke on route 803 and St. Elmo and Fairfield on route 801 were first shown as working stops on the maps issued in advance of the August 19th, 2018 CapMetro service changes.  Rutland on route 803 and Parmer, North Loop East, and Slaughter on route 801 were first shown as working stops on the maps issued in advance of the January 6th, 2019 CapMetro service changes.  However, Slaughter did not actually open until late 2019.

The southern terminus of route 803 was first shown as shifted to the newly-established Westgate Transit Center (with attached park-and-ride parking lot) on the maps issued in advance of the June 2, 2019 CapMetro service changes.

In addition to the new stations, Capital Metro has started installing new departure boards at many MetroRapid stations. These boards are made by Luminator Technology Group and use electronic ink to show the departures of the next several busses. The new boards have many advantages over the dot matrix boards that were installed with the original stations, such as showing departures for not only MetroRapid busses, but also local MetroBus routes that also serve that station. The dot matrix boards at the stations where the new E-ink boards were installed were turned off and are no longer used.

Future plans

Gold Line

The Gold Line is a planned  bus rapid transit line that would operate from ACC Highland to the South Congress Transit Center park-and-ride, and will travel on Airport, Red River, San Jacinto/Trinity, 7th/8th, Neches/Red River, 4th, Riverside, and South Congress. Stations will be ACC Highland, Clarkson, Hancock, St. David's, UT East, Medical School, Capitol East, Trinity, Downtown Station (where transfer to the Red, Green, or Blue Lines will be possible), Republic Square, Auditorium Shores, SoCo (South Congress), Oltorf, St. Edward's, and South Congress Transit Center. The Gold Line was changed to light rail in May 2020, citing a demographic that showed an increased projected ridership along the gold line that prompted its conversion to  light rail. In July 2020, planning for the line was reverted to bus service to lower construction costs in response to the economic crisis caused by the COVID-19 pandemic.

Criticism
The premium fare structure recommended by a consultant caused problems for the agency. It did not collect as much money back from the fare increase as was originally expected. Other BRT systems in Texas such as San Antonio and El Paso intentionally priced their BRT system for local fare.  The MetroRapid bus fare was lowered to regular bus prices on January 8, 2017

References

External links
Capital Metropolitan Transportation Authority

Bus transportation in Texas
Transportation in Austin, Texas
Transportation in Travis County, Texas
Bus rapid transit in Texas
Capital Metro